Ranveer Singh Bhavnani (born 6 July 1985) is an Indian actor who works in Hindi films. The recipient of several awards, including five Filmfare Awards, he is among the highest-paid Indian actors and has been featured in Forbes Indias Celebrity 100 list since 2012.

After graduating from Indiana University Bloomington, Singh made his acting debut with a leading role in Yash Raj Films' romantic comedy Band Baaja Baaraat. The film was as a critical and commercial success, earning him the Filmfare Award for Best Male Debut. He gained praise for playing a melancholic thief in the drama Lootera (2013), and established himself as a star through his collaborations with Sanjay Leela Bhansali, the first of which was in Goliyon Ki Raasleela Ram-Leela (2013). He gained critical acclaim for portraying Bajirao I and Alauddin Khilji in Bhansali's period dramas Bajirao Mastani (2015) and Padmaavat (2018), respectively. He won the Filmfare Award for Best Actor for the former and the Filmfare Critics Award for Best Actor for the latter. These, along with the action film Simmba (2018), in which he played the title character, rank among the highest-grossing Indian films. He won further Best Actor awards at Filmfare for playing an aspiring rapper in the musical drama Gully Boy (2019) and Kapil Dev in the sports film 83 (2021).

Singh has also hosted the television game show The Big Picture (2021–2022), and endorses several brands and products. He is married to his frequent co-star Deepika Padukone. Off-screen, he is known for his flamboyant fashion sense.

Early life and education 
Ranveer Singh Bhavnani was born on 6 July 1985 into a Sindhi family in Bombay, Maharashtra, India (now Mumbai), to Anju and Jagjit Singh Bhavnani. His grandparents moved to Bombay from Karachi, Sindh (in present-day Pakistan) during the Partition of India. He has an elder sister, Ritika Bhavnani. Singh is the paternal grandson of character-actress Chand Burke and is related to actor Anil Kapoor's family through his wife Sunita Kapoor (née Bhavnani). Singh explains that he dropped his surname Bhavnani, since he felt that the name would have been "too long, too many syllables", thus downplaying his brand as a "saleable commodity".

Singh always aspired to be an actor, participating in several school plays and debates. However, after he joined H.R. College of Commerce and Economics in Mumbai, Singh realised that getting a break in the film industry was not easy. Feeling that the idea of acting was "too far-fetched", Singh focused on creative writing. He went to the United States where he received his Bachelor of Arts degree in Telecommunications from Indiana University Bloomington in 2008. At the university, he decided to take acting classes and took up theatre as his minor.

After completing his studies and returning to Mumbai in 2007, Singh worked for a few years in advertising as a copywriter, with agencies like O&M and J. Walter Thompson. He also worked as an assistant director, but left it to pursue acting. He then decided to send his portfolio to directors.  He would go for all kinds of auditions, but did not get any good opportunities, while only getting calls for minor roles: "Everything was so bleak. It was very frustrating. There were times I would think whether I was doing the right thing or not."

Career

Breakthrough (2010–2014) 

In 2010, Singh auditioned for a lead role in Maneesh Sharma's Band Baaja Baaraat, a romantic comedy from the production company Yash Raj Films. Impressed by his audition, producer Aditya Chopra cast him for the part opposite Anushka Sharma. Singh described his role of Bittoo Sharma as a typical Delhi boy. To prepare for the role, he spent time with students at the Delhi University campus. Despite reservations about the film's commercial appeal from trade journalists, the film emerged as a sleeper hit. Singh's performance was praised, with Anupama Chopra of NDTV writing that Singh was "pitch perfect in the role of the uncouth but good-hearted small town slacker". At the annual Filmfare Awards, Singh won the award for Best Male Debut.

Following Band Baaja Baaraat, Singh signed on for Ladies vs Ricky Bahl, a romantic comedy once again produced by Chopra, directed by Maneesh Sharma, and co-starring Anushka Sharma. He played a conman Ricky Bahl who cons girls for a living but finally meets his match. According to Singh, the title character had various avatars in the film, including a chirpy, entertaining side and a sinister side. Nikhat Kazmi of The Times of India wrote, "Ranveer is, well Ranveer: your average Joe kind of hero who looks convincing enough as Sunny, Deven, Iqbal, Ricky, his sundry avatars." Commercially, Ladies vs Ricky Bahl performed moderately well. Singh received critical acclaim for Vikramaditya Motwane's period romance Lootera (2013), co-starring Sonakshi Sinha. An adaptation of O. Henry's short story The Last Leaf, the film tells the story of Pakhi Roy Chowdhury, a young Bengali woman who falls in love with Varun Shrivastava, a conman posing as an archaeologist. Rajeev Masand of CNN-IBN wrote that Singh "brings a quiet sensitivity to Varun, and occasionally a smoldering intensity. Offering a finely internalized performance, he leaves a lasting impression." Lootera underperformed commercially.

Singh next starred opposite Deepika Padukone in Sanjay Leela Bhansali's adaptation of William Shakespeare's Romeo and Juliet, titled Goliyon Ki Raasleela Ram-Leela, in which he played Ram, a Gujarati boy based on the character of Romeo. Bhansali was impressed by Singh's performance in Band Baaja Baaraat and decided to cast him for the film. Goliyon Ki Raasleela Ram-Leela generated positive reviews from critics, as did Singh's performance. Writing for India Today, Rohit Khilnani wrote that the film proved that he would be a star. Singh received a nomination for the Filmfare Award for Best Actor.

In 2014, Singh starred as a Bengali criminal in Ali Abbas Zafar's Gunday, alongside Arjun Kapoor, Priyanka Chopra and Irrfan Khan. David Chute of Variety praised Singh's screen presence and wrote that he "tucks the movie's center of interest under his arm and takes it with him — even though he has the could-be-thankless "good brother" role". Also, Singh's chemistry with Kapoor was considered by critic Rohit Khilnani to the prime asset of the film. Gunday proved to be Singh's biggest box office opener, and eventually emerged a box-office success with a revenue of  worldwide. After a cameo appearance in Finding Fanny, Singh starred as a gangster in Shaad Ali's poorly received crime drama Kill Dil opposite Parineeti Chopra and Ali Zafar.

Established actor (2015–2019) 
Zoya Akhtar's ensemble comedy-drama Dil Dhadakne Do (2015), produced by and cameo-starring her brother Farhan Akhtar, featured Singh alongside Anil Kapoor, Shefali Shah and Priyanka Chopra as the younger sibling of a dysfunctional Punjabi business family who aspires to become a pilot. Writing for Mumbai Mirror, Kunal Guha found Singh to be the "surprise element" of the film; he praised his "immaculate comic timing" and took note of his subtlety. Commercially, the film underperformed. He next reunited with Bhansali in the period romance Bajirao Mastani (2015), opposite Padukone and Chopra. He portrayed Bajirao I, for which he shaved his head and to prepare, he locked himself in a hotel room for 21 days. Raja Sen wrote that Singh "brings his character to life and does so with both machismo and grace", and commended him for his perfecting his character's gait and accent. The film earned  to become one of the highest-grossing Indian films, and garnered Singh the Filmfare Award for Best Actor.

In 2016, Singh starred in Aditya Chopra's comedy-romance Befikre opposite Vaani Kapoor. He played Dharam Gulati, a stand-up comic whose romantic liaisons with Kapoor's character leads to conflict between them. Set in Paris, Befikre marked the fourth project to be directed by Chopra. Singh performed a nude scene for it, a rare occurrence in an Indian film. Jay Weissberg of Variety found the film to be an "overly energetic twist on the old friends with benefits theme" and criticised Singh's "manic behavior". It underperformed at the box office.

After a year-long absence from the screen, Singh portrayed Alauddin Khilji, a ruthless Muslim king, in Sanjay Leela Bhansali's period drama Padmaavat (2018), co-starring Deepika Padukone and Shahid Kapoor, which marked his third collaboration with Bhansali and Padukone. Right-wing Hindu groups speculated that the film distorted historical facts, and issued violent threats against the cast and crew. The film's release was deferred and was allowed for exhibition after several modifications were made to it. Ankur Pathak of HuffPost criticised the film's misogynistic and regressive themes, but praised Singh for his "astute brilliance" in depicting Khilji's bisexuality. Rajeev Masand opined that he "plays the part with the sort of grotesque flamboyance that makes it hard to look at anyone or anything else when he's on the screen". Padmaavats production budget of  made it the most expensive Hindi film ever made at that time. He won the Filmfare Critics Award for Best Actor (shared with Ayushmann Khurrana for Andhadhun) and gained a Best Actor nomination at the ceremony.

At the end of the same year, Singh played the titular corrupt policeman in Rohit Shetty's action comedy Simmba, based on the Telugu-language film Temper (2015), co-starring Sara Ali Khan and Sonu Sood, which marked his first collaboration with filmmaker Karan Johar, who co-produced the film with Shetty. Despite disliking the film, Uday Bhatia of Mint credited Singh for playing his "cardboard creation" of a character with an "underlying sweetness that renders it more winsome than the humourless masculinity of Devgn's Singham".

Singh reteamed with Zoya Akhtar on Gully Boy (2019), a musical inspired by the life of the street rappers Divine and Naezy. Singh found little in common with his character of a poor man who aspires to become a rapper, and in preparation he underwent acting workshops and spent time with both Divine and Naezy. He performed his own rap songs and was pleased that the film brought attention to India's underground music scene. The film premiered at the 69th Berlin International Film Festival. Deborah Young of The Hollywood Reporter commended him for displaying a "pleasingly full emotional range that extends to drama and hip-hop" and writing for Film Companion, Baradwaj Rangan praised his ghetto accent and found his understated performance to be a "superb showreel for his range". Gully Boy won a record 13 Filmfare Awards, and Singh received another Best Actor award.

Career fluctuations (2020–present)
In 2021, Singh hosted the television game show The Big Picture, which aired on Colors TV. He reprised his role as Simmba in Shetty's action film Sooryavanshi in an extended cameo. Singh then portrayed cricketer Kapil Dev in Kabir Khan's 83, a sports film based on the 1983 Cricket World Cup. Initially planned for a 2020 release, 83 was delayed several times owing to casting and pre-production that postponed filming, and later due to the COVID-19 pandemic in India. Reviews for the film were positive, with praise for Singh's portrayal of Dev. Singh's performance won him his third Filmfare Award for Best Actor.

Singh's first film release of 2022 was Jayeshbhai Jordaar, a satire about female infanticide in India. Anna M.M. Vetticad of Firstpost disliked the film but commended him for "transform[ing] his body, body language and demeanour, his posture, his walk, his gestures and his entire personality" for the part, similar to how he had "metamorphosed" to play Dev in 83. He then played dual roles in Rohit Shetty's ensemble comedy  Cirkus (2022), based on William Shakespeare's play Comedy of Errors. In a scathing review, Nandini Ramnath of Scroll.in dismissed Singh's performance as "consistently lacklustre". Both Jayeshbhai Jordar and Cirkus were commercially unsuccessful.

Singh will next star in Karan Johar's romantic comedy Rocky Aur Rani Ki Prem Kahani opposite Alia Bhatt.

Personal life and media image 

Singh began dating Deepika Padukone, his co-star in Goliyon Ki Raasleela Ram-Leela, in August 2012. In October 2018, the couple announced their impending marriage. The following month, they married in traditional Konkani Hindu and Sikh Anand Karaj (Singh's paternal grandfather is Sikh) ceremonies at Lake Como, Italy.

Singh has appeared in Forbes India Celebrity 100 list since 2012, reaching his highest position (seventh) in 2019. That year, the magazine estimated his annual earnings to be  and ranked him as the fifth-highest-paid actor in the country. He was also featured by GQ in their listing of the 50 most influential young Indians of 2017 and 2019. In 2019, India Today featured him among the nation's 50 most powerful people.

In addition to his acting career, Singh launched his own record label in 2019, named IncInk, to promote local musicians. He endorses several brands,
including Adidas, Head & Shoulders, Ching's, Jack & Jones, Thums Up, and MakeMyTrip. Singh is also an investor in Vineeta Singh's start-up Sugar Cosmetics. Duff & Phelps estimated his brand value to be US$63 million, in 2019, the fourth-highest of Indian celebrities. In 2022, he peaked at the second position with a brand value of US$158.3 million.

Off-screen, Singh is known for his flamboyant fashion sense. In July 2022, Singh appeared nude in a photoshoot for Paper magazine. A month later, he was summoned by Mumbai Police for questioning in connection with several police complaints that were filed against him after the pictures went viral on social media.

Filmography

Films

Television

Discography

Awards and nominations 

Singh is the recipient of four Filmfare Awards: Best Male Debut for Band Baaja Baaraat (2010), Best Actor for Bajirao Mastani (2016) and Gully Boy (2019), and biographical drama 83 (2021) and Best Actor (Critics) for Padmaavat (2018).

References

External links 
 
 
 

1985 births
Living people
Indian male film actors
Indian male dancers
Indiana University alumni
Male actors in Hindi cinema
Sindhi people
Indian people of Sindhi descent
Male actors from Mumbai
21st-century Indian male actors
Filmfare Awards winners
International Indian Film Academy Awards winners
Screen Awards winners
Zee Cine Awards winners